Gonçalo Duarte Amaral Sousa (born 19 April 1998) is a Portuguese professional footballer who plays for S.C. Olhanense as a midfielder.

Football career
On 12 May 2018, Duarte made his professional debut with Académico Viseu in a 2017–18 LigaPro match against Santa Clara.

References

External links

1998 births
Living people
People from Viseu
Portuguese footballers
Association football midfielders
Liga Portugal 2 players
Académico de Viseu F.C. players
S.C. Olhanense players
Sportspeople from Viseu District